These are the results for the 2005 UCI Road World Championships bicycle race road race. The men's elite race was held on Sunday September 25, 2005 in Madrid, Spain, over a total distance of 273 kilometres. Despite several rumours before the race that some Belgian cyclists would ride for  teammate Robbie McEwen, the Belgian squad did work together and their leader Tom Boonen (of the opposing  team) won the race.

Final classification

5 riders did not start the race although on the official list of participants, while 52 riders started but did not finish the race.

External links
Race website

Men's Road Race
UCI Road World Championships – Men's road race
UCI Road World Championships

de:Straßen-Radweltmeisterschaft 2005